Lefkonas is a village and a former municipality in the Serres regional unit, Greece. Since the 2011 local government reform it is part of the municipality Serres, of which it is a municipal unit. The municipal unit has an area of 68.247 km2. Population 3,905 (2011).

Near the village - on the hill of "Simitzi-bair" - the location of an ancient settlement has been found.

Notable people
Sakis Anastasiadis
Kostas Tsimikas
Christos Archontidis
Iraklis Kyriakidis

External links 
 Local Authority (Dimos) Webpage

See also
List of settlements in the Serres regional unit

References 

Populated places in Serres (regional unit)
Archaeological sites in Macedonia (Greece)

el:Δήμος Λευκώνα